Murrumbateman is a town in the Southern Tablelands of New South Wales, Australia. It is on the Barton Highway, approximately 30 kilometres north-west of Canberra, and is part of the Yass Valley Shire.

History and economy 

With the arrival of European settlers in the 19th century sheep farming, wheat growing and goldmining became major economic activities. The first government school opened in 1869.

Winemaking began in Murrumbateman in the 1970s with some of the surrounding rural properties being developed as grape growing areas or as boutique wineries.

Similar subdivisions have occurred in other regions around Canberra including Bungendore, Sutton, Gundaroo and Burra. Residents tend to commute to Canberra for work rather than make a living off the small parcels of land. Other nearby towns are Yass, Gunning and Dalton.

Murrumbateman has a pub and a handful of retail outlets.

The Murrumbateman Market is held fortnightly at the Recreation Ground. The market focus is on local produce and local arts and crafts but there is always a range of products from the wider Yass Valley and beyond including fruit and vegetables, breads, cakes, jams, olives, chillies, sauces, biodynamic beef and a range of wines from the local area plus woollen and alpaca products and handmade goods of all types.

Annual events

 The Murrumbateman Pony Club hold an annual show jumping festival in June. The event is open for Pony Club Members.
The Murrumbateman Field Days is held in October each year and draws large crowds from Canberra and Yass
 The Australian Cool Climate Wine Show is held annually in September

Facilities and services

The trees around the grounds are heritage listed and parking underneath them is not recommended.

Murrumbateman has the following Sporting clubs:

Murrumbateman Pony Club
Murrumbateman Eagles AFL Club

Murrumbateman has the following facilities:

Market - 9am to 1pm on 2nd and 4th Saturday each month www.mvmarket.com
Park
Public toilets
Motel next to a takeaway store
Petrol station/supermarket
Garage
Accountant
Butcher
Rural supplies store
Rural Fire Service 
Pub
Guesthouses
Abode Hotel
Restaurants
Wineries
Australia Post agency
Hair & beauty salon
Dentist
Doctor
Pharmacy
Veterinary clinic
Dance school 
Pre-school
Family day care
Library
Catholic Church
Uniting Church
I.T. specialist
Landcare group

New development
The Fairley Estate, a new 100 home subdivision at Murrumbateman, will add 60 per cent more housing to Murrumbateman and trigger other infrastructure and commercial developments. Consisting of an adjoining 19 hectares, the new subdivision is named Fairley after a Murrumbateman teacher of the early 1900s. It will include a commercial and tourist precinct with an international hotel chain as a tenant, boutique brewery, bakery, childcare, visitors' centre and cafe and children's park, medical services and post office.

Population
In the 2016 Census, there were 3,219 people in Murrumbateman. 82.8% of people were born in Australia. The next most common country of birth was England at 4.6%. 91.4% of people spoke only English at home. The most common responses for religion were No Religion 34.2%, Catholic 25.5% and Anglican 18.5%.

Notable people 
 Sir Walter Merriman – sheep breeder, knighted in 1954 for his contributions to the fine wool industry, and founder of the Merryville stud, Murrumbateman
 David Pereira - Australian cellist

References

Further reading
 Dorothy Mulholland: Far away days: a history of the Murrumbateman, Jeir and Nanima districts. Murrumbateman Old School Grounds Committee, 1995.
 David James Wagner, Jr.: Background notes on the district of Murrumbateman, 1824-1960. Murrumbateman, 1960. Republished online at: History of Murrumbateman (NSW), 1824-1960 Retrieved 23 August 2016.
 Meryl Hunter: From the beginning: a history of the Murrumbateman Field Days to 2006. Murrumbateman Agricultural Bureau and Progress Association, 2009.

External links
 Murrumbateman - general website on Murrumbateman
 Murrumbateman Field Days
 Murrumbateman Market
 Australian Cool Climate Wine Show
 Fairley Estate
 

Towns in New South Wales
Southern Tablelands
Yass Valley Council